Harvey Munford (born July 19, 1940) is a Democratic former member of the Nevada Assembly, representing the Clark County District 6 from 2004 until 2016.

Birth
Harvey Munford was born on July 19, 1940 in Akron, Ohio.

Religion
Harvey Munford practices the religion of Baptist Christianity.

Family
Harvey Munford is married to Viviana.

Current Legislative Committees
Harvey Munford has been a member of the following committees:
Education, Member
Elections, Procedures, Ethics, and Constitutional Amendments, Member
Government Affairs, Member
Natural Resources, Agriculture and Mining, Member
Taxation, Vice Chair

Education
Harvey Munford has received his education from the following institutions:
8MA, Counseling and Political Science, Montana State University, Billings, 1966
BA, Biology and Physical Education, Montana State University, Billings

Professional Experience
Harvey Munford has had the following professional experience:
School Teacher, Clark County School District, retired
Basketball Player, Los Angeles Lakers

References

External links 

Nevada Assembly - Harvey Munford official government website
Project Vote Smart - Representative Harvey J. Munford (NV) profile
Follow the Money - Harvey Munford
2006 2004 2000 campaign contributions

Democratic Party members of the Nevada Assembly
1940 births
Living people
21st-century American politicians